Nurdin may be
a variant spelling of the Muslim given name Nur al-Din "light of religion"
dialectal form of the name of Northend, Warwickshire